Ogarovo is a rural locality (a village) in Chuchkovskoye Rural Settlement, Sokolsky District, Vologda Oblast, Russia. The population was 220 as of 2002.

Geography 
Ogarovo is located 81 km northeast of Sokol (the district's administrative centre) by road. Varushino is the nearest rural locality.

References 

Rural localities in Sokolsky District, Vologda Oblast